Line 3 of the Guangzhou Metro is a  rapid transit line connects  to . The entire line, including all track and stations, is located in tunnels. Its  main branch, excluding the  branch between Tianhe Coach Terminal and Tiyu Xilu, is now the third longest continuous subway tunnel in the world, and the longest rail tunnel of any kind (surpassing the Gotthard Base Tunnel in Switzerland).

Line 3 is split into two sections, Shiqiao line (main line, from Panyu Square to Tianhe Coach Terminal) and Airport line (northern branch, Tiyu Xilu to Airport North), and are branded with the colour orange. The line is extremely congested, with numerous sections officially operating over 100% capacity. The line uses Seltrac S40 communications-based train control from Alcatel.

History

Initial Section 
Line 3 started out as a short peripheral line in Guangzhou's "Five-Line" subway masterplan in the early 1990s. It was envisioned as a north south circulator line for the Tianhe District's new CBD connecting Guangzhou East railway station with the proposed Zhujiang New Town CBD, crossing the Pearl River to Chigang station on what was then Line 2 and turning east to Xinzhou. Essentially taking over the section of Today's Line 8 between Chigang and Wanshengwei stations. However at the time it was planned to run under Liede Avenue just east of the new CBD instead of under Xiyu West Road like it does today. In Guangzhou's updated "Seven-Line" subway masterplan published in the late 1990s the proposed Line 3 plan was extended north to arc over old Guangzhou terminating around Chatou Station on Line 13 and Line 12. Additionally the southern section of the line was rerouted southwest roughly following today's Line 12 between Chigang and Luntou, with the section east to Xinzhou mostly being taken over by what is today Line 8.

Line 3 was redesigned into a pure north south line running between Guangzhou East Railway station to reach Panyu District. A branch line was added between Tiyu Xilu station and Tianhe Coach Terminal station. The change was done in response with the local government's "Southern Expansion" plan to develop the southern areas of Guangzhou. This plan required faster transportation links with Panyu District and the new CBD. At the time limited ridership of the first phases of Line 1 and 2 as well as underestimated urban growth rates lead to downscaling of Line 3's trains. The line would use three car Type B trains instead of higher capacity six car Type A trains used in Line 1 and 2; assuming that capacity shortfalls would be mitigated by running a more frequent service, with an ultimate train configuration of six cars in the future as demand slowly increases. Additionally, a separate Airport Express line between Guangzhou's New Baiyun International Airport and the new CBD was proposed.

Construction the first section of Line 3 between East Guangzhou Railway station and officially commenced with groundbreaking on the experimental segment at Datang station in 2001. On January 26, 2003, construction work at Datang was completed and capped. On February 8, 2003 tunnel boring machines begin boring tunnels on the first section of Line 3. Tunnel boring machines beginning boring tunnels on a section of Line 3 at Tiyu Xilu station. Tiyu Xilu Station will use cut-and-cover construction with a bored section in the middle where it runs under Line 1 with only  of cover. On May 30, 2003 Construction work at Shiqiao station was completed and capped one month ahead of schedule. At the same time, Lijiao station begin construction works. 99 sets of escalators were purchased from Hitachi for the project. The entire project was opened in stages between 2005 and 2006.

North South Express Line 
During construction of the initial segment, Line 3 and the Airport Express Line were redesigned and now planned as a single project that begins to resemble its configuration today; A line from Baiyun International Airport to Haibang station via Zhujiang New Town and Panyu Square. The Airport Express Line was merged into Line 3 as the Line 3 Phase 2 project. The expected long term peak demand section of the Phase 2 project is 20,000 passengers per hour per direction. This allowed for the use of Line 3's three car Type B trains on the Airport Line, again assuming that capacity shortfalls would be mitigated by running a more frequent service, with an ultimate train configuration of six cars in the future. Additionally, passing loops and higher speed operations were proposed for the Airport Line to allow for distinct airport express and regular local services similar to the MTR Tung Chung line and Airport Express in Hong Kong. The express services would run between Guangzhou Baiyun International Airport and Tiyu Xilu and only stop at what is today Jiahewanggang, Yantang, Guangzhou East railway stations. The Phase 2 Project extends Line 3 north to the new airport on a mostly elevated alignment. In 2007,  of Phase 2 line also redesigned to run underground instead of elevated at a cost of an additional 1 billion Yuan. With the redesigned underground alignment, passing loops for express services were removed to control construction costs. The line was now completely transformed into a north south express line with wide stop spacings and  operation in suburban sections instead of a local metro line, with aspects of an express railway link, as first envisioned. Later Yongtai station and Gaozeng station was added to the plan the latter station added in anticipation for Line 9. On October 30, 2010 Line 3 Phase 2 entered operation.

Congestion 
In 2010, after the completion of Phase 2, Line 3 has become the most important north-south traffic artery in the urban area of Guangzhou. This is a far cry from the peripheral circulator line it was originally envisioned to be in the 1990s. Massive developments at the Zhujiang New Town CBD and strong population growth of Guangzhou as a whole, created unforeseen high demand and heavy congestion for the line which forced new B2 and B4 series six car trains to be ordered and existing B1 series three car trains were linked together to form six car sets, decades ahead of the original timeline. The new B2 and B4 series trains will have luggage racks to support Line 3's role as an airport rail link. The new trains gradually allowed the line to operate to its ultimate configuration of six car type B trains running just at two minute headways. Severe congestion continued to plague the line even at its ultimate design configuration as demand continued to increase. In June 2014, the maximum full load rate in the morning peak of the whole line of Line 3 was as high as 136%, appearing in the interval between Kecun Station and Guangzhou Tower Station. In 2015, with daily average ridership reaching over 1.5 million passengers per day, several rows of seats and all luggage racks where removed from all trains in an attempt to increase capacity. In June 2017, the ridership of Line 3 has grown to average over 2 million passengers per day. In March 2018, the whole line heading in the peak direction of the Zhujiang New Town CBD exceeded 100% capacity during the AM peak period with a maximum full load rate exceeding 120% in the section from Yantang Station to Guangzhou East Station on the Airport Line. The busiest section of Line 3 carries over 60,000 pphpd in 2018, multiples over the long term 20,000 pphpd volume projected during the Airport Line's construction. By 2020, the most congested section of Line 3 reached 150% capacity. Peak period headways have been reduced to every 1 minute 58 seconds and how reaches fleet and signal system capacities. The under construction Line 18 and proposed Line 26 is expected to relieve the congestion of Line 3.

Train service
There are 4 types of train services offered on the metro line 3:

 — 
 — 
 — 
 ←  (southbound trains only, operating during morning peak hours on working days)

Stations
N - Northern extension (Airport Branch)
M - Main line
MN - Thru Services
 OSI - Out-of-station interchange (only available for IC cards users)

Special short-distance service 
Due to route planning issues, it is difficult for passengers in the middle of the route to board the train. In order to solve this problem, short-distance service trains will be added at certain times. The known service arrangements are as follows:
Between  and : This service is only available during peak hours in the morning on weekdays.
Between  and : This service is only available during peak hours in the morning on weekdays.
From /// to : This service is only available during peak hours in the morning on weekdays. Since 2013, it provide services from Tonghe Station to Dashi Station. After providing short-distance service between Panyu Square Station and Tonghe Station in 2018, there will be one train departing from Longgui Station and two trains departing from Jiahe Wanggang Station at about 8:00, and one train departing from Tianhe Coach Terminal Station at about 8:18. After arriving at the terminal station, Dashi Station, some trains will resume normal services, and other trains will end the service and keep stand by.
From // to : This service is available in the morning and evening peak hours. 
From  to : This service is available in the morning and evening peak hours. 
From / to : This service is the last trains before the end of the day's operation service. After the train reaches the end, it will end the service and return to the Jiahe Wanggang depot.
From / to : This service is only available during peak hours in the evening on weekdays.

Future Expansion

Eastern Extension 
A further extension east of Haibang Station to Hai'ou Island and eventually across the Pearl River to Dongguan was proposed in 2007. In 2017, the Guangzhou Municipal Land Planning Commission approved the planning for Line 3 to be extended to Hai'ou Island. However, the extension eastward beyond Panyu Square station was approved by National Development and Reform Commission to only reach Haibang station as part of Guangzhou's (2015-2025) subway expansion plan in March 2018. It was revealed that the extension to Hai'ou Island is reserved for future planning. The extension is 9.58 km long as will add four new stations and connect Line 3 to Line 4. Construction of this extension started November 19, 2018.

Line 10 
The Tiyu Xilu-Tianhe Coach Terminal Section is planned to no longer operate as part of Line 3. The Shipaiqiao-Tianhe Coach Terminal Section will be transferred to Line 10, with the remaining Main and Northern sections being combined into one single service.

Rolling Stock 
As of 2020 there is currently a fleet of 71 six car trains serving Line 3. To accommodate increased fleet requirements for the eastern extension, an additional 10 six car trainsets have been ordered. In August 2020, plans were announced a further 18 additional trains to be purchased for Line 3 to reduce headways and improve capacity. This will push the fleet serving Line 3 to 99 trainsets.

References

03
Railway lines opened in 2005
2005 establishments in China
Airport rail links in China
1500 V DC railway electrification